Thomas Cope may refer to:
Thomas Cope (manufacturer) (1827–1884), English tobacco manufacturer
Thomas Cope (judge) (1821–1891), judge in colonial Victoria (Australia)
Thomas D. Cope (1880–1964), American physicist and historian of science 
Sir Thomas Cope, 1st Baronet (1840–1924), of the Cope baronets
Sir Thomas George Cope, 2nd Baronet (1884–1966), of the Cope baronets
Thomas Cope (politician) (c. 1814–1882), member of the Legislative Assembly of Victoria 1868–1877

See also
Cope (surname)